Lavia may refer to:

Lavia (genus), a species of bat
Lavia, Finland, a former municipality in Finland
, a cruise ship which caught fire and sank in 1989
Gabriele Lavia, Italian actor and film director